882 Naval Air Squadron (882 NAS) was a Naval Air Squadron of the Royal Navy's Fleet Air Arm. It was formed as a carrier based fighter squadron in July 1941 and served through the rest of the Second World War. It took part in the British invasion of Madagascar and Operation Torch, the Anglo-American invasion of North Africa in 1942, and in the invasion of Southern France in August 1945, also taking part in operations in the Aegean and off Norway. It was disbanded after the end of the war, in October 1945.

Service
881 Naval Air Squadron was first formed on 15 July 1941 at RNAS Donibristle in Fife, Scotland as a carrier fighter squadron. Initial equipment was a mixture of Grumman Martlets and Hawker Sea Hurricanes, although it settled on the Martlet before it embarked on its first carrier, in March 1942. While a detachment of two aircraft joined the escort carrier  in April that year, the rest of the squadron remained with Illustrious  as the fleet carrier took part in the invasion of Madagascar in May 1942. The squadron's Martlets, together with those of 881 Squadron, carried out fighter patrols and ground attack missions during the initial attacks on Diego Suarez from 5 to 7 May. 882 Squadron was merged into 881 Squadron on 19 May, although the former 882 Squadron operated as a semi-independent unit at first. The detachment aboard Archer continued to operate after the main part of the squadron disbanded, disembarking from Archer at New York in July and disbanding at Floyd Bennett Field, Brooklyn on 30 September.

The squadron reformed at Donibristle on 7 September 1942, from a core of personnel from "A" Flight of 806 Squadron, embarking on the carrier  in October that year to take part in Operation Torch, the Anglo-American invasion of North Africa. On the morning of 8 November, the first day of the landings, four of the squadron's Martlets strafed Blida Airfield, claiming two Vichy French aircraft, a Douglas DB-7 bomber and a Potez 540 transport destroyed on the ground, while later that morning, when a second flight of four 882 Squadron Martlets patrolled over Blida, White flags were seen being waved, and one of the Martlets landed and took the surrender of the airfield, waiting there until a group of Commandos arrived to take possession of the airfield. On 9 November, two of the squadron's Martlets shot down a German Heinkel He 111 bomber, while a German Junkers Ju 88 bomber was damaged by two more Martlets. 882 Squadron remained aboard Victorious when the carrier was deployed to the Pacific to work with the US Fleet in May–July 1943, supplementing its Martlets with a few US Navy Wildcats during the deployment.

The squadron disembarked from Victorious in September 1943, joining the escort carrier  in December that year alongside 898 Squadron, also equipped with Martlets. In March 1944, Searcher joined the British Home Fleet and on 3 April 1944, took part in Operation Tungsten, a carrier strike against the German battleship  at Kaafjord in the far north of Norway. 882 Squadron provided close escort to the attacking Fairey Barracuda dive bombers, and strafed Tirpitz to suppress anti-aircraft fire before the Barracudas bombed. Searcher carried out further operations off Norway through the rest of April and into May, and was then used to escort convoys to Gibraltar. On 5 July 1944, 882 Squadron absorbed 898 Squadron, which was disbanded, with the strength of 882 Squadron increasing to 24 Wildcats.

On 15 July 1944, Searcher left for the Mediterranean with 882 Squadron aboard, and from 15 August took part in Operation Dragoon, the Allied invasion of Southern France. 882's Wildcats flew 167 sorties during Dragoon, with three aircraft missing and one ditched due to engine failure.  In September that year, Searcher took part in Operation Outing, an offensive by the Royal Navy against German forces in the Aegean Sea, with 882 Squadron flying Combat Air Patrol over the allied fleet, as well as armed reconnaissance missions over Crete and bombing a German radar station. Searcher returned to British waters in October, with 882 Squadron disembarking for training and re-equipment with Wildcat VI aircraft at RNAS Ballyhalbert and RAF Long Kesh, Northern Ireland while Searcher was refitted at a shipyard on the River Clyde. The squadron returned to Searcher in February 1945, and continued to be employed in operations off Norway, taking part in Operation Judgement, a strike by aircraft from Searcher,  and  attacked a German U-boat base at Kilbotn, Norway on 4 May 1945, the last combat operation by the Home Fleet.

The squadron left for the Far East in June 1945 aboard Searcher, but had only reached Ceylon when the war against Japan ended on 15 August. The squadron disbanded when Searcher arrived back at Britain on 9 October 1945.

Battle honours
The following Battle Honours have been awarded to 882 Naval Air Squadron.
 Diego Suarez 1942
 North Africa 1942
 Atlantic 1943–44
 South France 1944
 Norway 1944–45
 Arctic 1945

References

  
 
 
 
 
 
 

800 series Fleet Air Arm squadrons
Military units and formations established in 1941
Military units and formations of the Royal Navy in World War II